Gwangmyeong (Korean: 광명시) is a city in Gyeonggi Province, South Korea. It borders Seoul to the east, north and northeast, Anyang to the southeast, Siheung to the southwest, and Bucheon to the northeast.

Gwangmyeong is home to one of the world's largest IKEA stores at 59,000 square meters (640,000 square feet), along with a large Costco store and a Lotte Premium Outlet.

History 
Gwangmyeong City area was part of the old (or original) Siheung County as with Yeongdeungpo, Guro, and Geumcheon areas. It belonged to West (seo-myeon) and South townships of original Siheung County. In 1914, the two townships were merged into West township of "expanded" Siheung County.

In 1963, the northern part of Gwangmyeong (at that time, the northern part of West Township in Siheung County) area was merged into an expanded Seoul (i.e. districts for urban planning in Seoul. ) as with Gwacheon (at that time Gwacheon was a township in Siheung County) and Sindo township of Goyang County (now parts of Goyang City which borders Seoul). The neighbourhood of Gwangmyeong (Gwangmyeong-dong) and Cheolsan (Cheolsan-dong) were developed as a residence zone next to Seoul and it was provisionally planned to be administratively merged with Seoul Metropolitan City. In 1974, Gwangmyeong-ri and Cheolsan-ri became a part of the county branch of Gwangmyeong ( gwang-myeong-chul-jang-so) and in 1979 southern part of Gwangmyeong area became Soha town ( so-ha-eub). In 1981, the annexation to Seoul foundered as Seoul's unexpected rapid growth greatly concerned government officials. Consequently, the county branch of Gwangmyeong and Soha town merged and formed a new city of Gwangmyeong, instead of being annexed to Guro-gu, Seoul.

In the 1980s and the early 1990s, many apartment complexes were built in Cheolsan-dong and Haan-dong. The population increased up to 300,000.  In 1995, the Seoul-Gwangmyeong boundary was readjusted, in which a tiny part of Cheolsan-dong was merged into the newly created Geumcheon-gu, Seoul. In 2004, Gwangmyeong Station was open, and in 2010, apartment complexes in Soha-dong were built up.

Districts 

There are 18 administrative districts (dong in Korean language) in Gwangmyeong. Specifically, these are: Gwangmyeong Dong (from 1-7; Gwangmyeong 6-dong is also known as Okgil dong), Cheolsan Dong (4 dongs), Ha-an Dong (4 dongs), Soha Dong (2 dongs; The southern part of Soha 2-dong is also known as Iljik dong), and Hak-on dong (Gahak-dong and No-onsa dong). In 1995, a tiny section of Gwangmyeong was ceded to Seoul's newly created Geumcheon-gu.

Disputes on municipal annexation to Seoul 
Due to its history of being part of the urban planning districts of Seoul until December 1982, the living sphere of Gwangmyeong is similar to Seoul's Yeongdeungpo ( seo-ul yeong-deung-po saeng-hwal-kwon) rather than 'Western Gyeonggi's living sphere' ( gyeong-gi seo-bu-saeng-hwal-kwon) such as Bucheon and Anyang. The sewage system is linked to Seoul, though the nearest sewage treatment plant is located on the boundary between Gwangmyeong and Anyang, and the city heavily relies on Seoul's telephone and transport systems (local dial code. The phone area code for Gwangmyeong is Seoul's 02 and many Seoul buses and taxis are in business in that city); advertisements of firms in Yeongdeungpo area can be easily seen in the city. Gwangmyeong not belonging to Seoul, Gwangmyeong residents have to go to a district court office and a reserve soldier's drill camp (of the 51st Infantry Division, Capital Corps) in 'farther' Ansan City other than a district court in nearby Sinjeong-dong and a reserve soldier's drill camp (of the 52nd Infantry Division, CDC) in Anyang.

Proponents of the incorporation in Seoul argue that by annexing the city into capital Seoul, in which Gwangmyeong City of Gyeonggi Province becomes Gwangmyeong District of Seoul, the discord between a life zone and administrative districts, in terms of metropolitan governance, can be resolved. They also insist that by the annexation, residents in Gwangmyeong can benefit from metropolitan services and governance of Seoul Metropolitan City, especially in public transport. Congressman and former mayor of Gwangmyeong Baek Jae-hyeon presented a special bill for "municipal annexation to Seoul for Gwangmyeong" on the floor in September 2009, though his attempt turned out in vain at last. Opponents insist that the annexation would tarnish municipal autonomy in Gwangmyeong and it would also worsen balanced development of non-capital areas on the national level. The central government once proposed that Gwangmyeong be merged with Bucheon other than being annexed to Seoul.

Education 
There are nine high schools, ten middle schools, and 21 elementary schools in Gwangmyeong. Prior to 2013, middle school students who wished to go to high school had to take the entrance exam. Gwangmyeong-buk High School and Jinseong High School are traditionally well known for higher standards of students' academic ability.

Libraries 
Gwangmyeong Central Library (광명 중앙도서관 gwang-myeong-jung-ahng-do-seo-gwan)
Cheolsan Library (철산 도서관 cheol-san-do-seo-gwan)
HaAn Library (하안 도서관 ha-an-do-seo-gwan)
Chunghyeon Library (충현 도서관 chung-hyeon-do-seo-gwan)
Soha Library (소하도서관 so-ha-do-seo-gwan)
Cheolsandong Library (철산동 연서 도서관 cheol-san-dong-yeon-seo-do-seo-gwan) Completed in June 2020

Residential areas 
Since Gwangmyeong is a commuter town bordering Seoul, it's mostly a residential area. The northwestern part of Gwangmyeong, namely Gwangmyeong-dong, is mostly composed of low-storeyed detached houses, while the eastern part, namely Cheolsan-dong and Haan-dong, consists of high-storeyed apartment complexes. Throughout the late 2000s, old public low-storeyed apartment complexes (저층 주공아파트 jeo-cheng ju-gong-ah-pa-teu) in Cheolsan-dong were rebuilt into private high-storeyed apartment complexes (고층 민간아파트 go-cheng min-gan-ah-pa-teu). In 2010, some parts of Soha-dong was developed to newly built public apartment complexes.

Shopping 

Gwangmyeong is home to one of the world's largest IKEA stores, with the second largest store located in Goyang, and a large Lotte Premium Outlet that is connected to the IKEA. The city is also home to a large Costco warehouse which also serves as the headquarters of Costco Korea. A large Korean-style traditional market, Gwangmyeong Market, is located in the Gwangmyeong crossroads with Gwangmyeongsageori Station. Modern shopping malls are in Cheolsan Station, Haan crossroads, and Soha-dong (E-mart and Costco). Gwangmyeong residents can also use shopping malls (Lotte Mart and Homeplus) in nearby Guro-gu and Geumcheon-gu. Clothes outlets are located in nearby Gasan-dong in Seoul.

Medical services 
A local general hospital, Gwangmyeong Sungae Hospital is in Cheolsan-dong and it is recently affiliated with Medical School of Kwandong University. A university hospital, Korea University Medical Center at Guro (구로고대병원 gu-ro-go-dae-byeong-weon) is located in nearby Guro-dong, Seoul. A public medical centre is in southernmost Haan-dong.

Many private clinics are located along with business areas in the city.

Climate 
Gwangmyeong has a humid continental climate (Köppen: Dwa), but can be considered a borderline humid subtropical climate (Köppen: Cwa) using the  isotherm.

Transportation

Railroads 
 Korail
 Seoul Subway Line 1 Doksan Station Gwangmyeong Shuttle
(Geumcheon-gu, Seoul) ← Gwangmyeong
 KTX
(Seoul) ← Gwangmyeong → (Southern Gyeonggi Province)
 SMRT
 Seoul Subway Line 7
() ← Cheolsan — Gwangmyeongsageori →

Buses 
 Hwayeong Bus Corporation : a local bus firm in Gwangmyeong
 many Seoul buses are in business in Gwangmyeong, as their garages are located in that city.

Taxis 
As of 1999 (provisional)/2004 (permanent), Gwangmyeong's taxi business district was consolidated to Guro and Geumcheon, Seoul. The taxi fare is the same as that of Seoul taxis.

Attractions 
The tombs of Yi Sun-sin (not to be confused with the more famous admiral of the same name) and Lee Won-ik are in the city, just north of Gwangmyeong Station. Lee Won Ik's cultural relics are also on display here. The city is also home to the Gwangmyeong Velodrome, the largest domed structure in South Korea.

Gwangmyeong Cave, a former mine, now tourist attraction, is located near Gwangmyeong station.

Industry 
The city, though small, hosts many firms. In total, there are 630 companies employing 11,636 people.

The city was officially planned to promote small businesses. Such workers can take merits of getting fee of rent, land and even costs for investment.

Kia Motors Sohari Plant 
In 1973, The Kia Motors located its Sohari Plant in Soha-dong, Gwangmyeong City, becoming the country's first integrated automobile assembly plant.

As Kia's car factory nearest to Seoul, it has convenient access to labor and other resources and can conveniently provide completed goods to the Seoul metropolitan area.

Notable people 
Historical figures
General Yi Sun-sin – military officer who fought under the more famous admiral Yi Sun-sin during the Imjin war
Entertainers
Onew (Shinee) – born in Gwangmyeong
The Quiett – born in Gwangmyeong
Yang Hyun-suk (YG)
Yoo Yeon-jung (WJSN) – born in Gwangmyeong
Kim Jun-hyun – attended school in Gwangmyeong

Twin towns – sister cities 

Gwangmyeong is twinned with:

 Austin, United States
 Jecheon, South Korea
 Yesan, South Korea
 Taean, South Korea
 Seocheon, South Korea
 Liaocheng, China
 Osnabrück, Germany
 Yamato, Japan

See also 
 Geography of South Korea

References

External links
 City government website 
 City Council website 

 
Cities in Gyeonggi Province